KAXE (91.7 FM) is a community licensed public radio station serving Northern Minnesota communities, including Grand Rapids, Brainerd, Bemidji, Virginia, Chisholm and Hibbing. The station airs locally produced news, talk, and music programming.  It is a member of Ampers, a group of public radio stations in Minnesota that are not affiliated with Minnesota Public Radio.  It is also a member of National Public Radio, and is the only full NPR member in the state that is not an MPR affiliate.

In May 2005, the station moved into a new, larger studio space on the Mississippi River in Grand Rapids (previously, the station had been based at Itasca Community College). There is an additional translators located in Brainerd (K210DR 89.9 FM).

As of March 2012, KAXE has a sister station, KBXE. Licensed to Bagley, KBXE's studios are at 305 America Ave NW in Bemidji. It broadcasts on a frequency of 90.5 and has a 50,000 watt transmitter. The broadcast tower is west of Bemidji, near Shevlin.

KAXE Transmitters

See also
List of community radio stations in the United States

Notes

External links
KAXE official website
KBXE official page

KAXE
KAXE
KAXE
Community radio stations in the United States
Radio stations established in 1976
1976 establishments in Minnesota
Grand Rapids, Minnesota